The Stand: American Nightmares is a five-issue comic book miniseries, the second of five The Stand series by Marvel Comics, adapting Stephen King's 1978 novel of the same name. It was overseen by King, written by Roberto Aguirre-Sacasa, illustrated by Mike Perkins, and colored by Laura Martin.

Publisher's summary
The deadly super flu Captain Trips has devastated the country and now the few survivors must pick up the pieces and go on. Larry Underwood seeks escape from New York City. Lloyd contemplates an extremely unsavory dinner option in jail, and Stu Redman makes a desperate bid for freedom from his interrogators. Most ominous of all, the strange being called Randall Flagg continues his dreadful journey across the devastated landscape of America.

Issues

References

External links
 THE STAND: AMERICAN NIGHTMARE #1
 The Stand Returns With American Nightmares

2009 comics debuts
American Nightmares